Lucha Libre USA: Masked Warriors is an American Lucha Libre promotion and television program on the MTV2 broadcast channel, chronicling the rise of Mexican-style wrestling, or lucha libre, in the United States. The first episode was aired on July 16, 2010. The second season premiered October 1, 2011. On July 11, 2012 the remainder of season two began airing on Hulu with the final episode airing on October 3, 2012.

History
On July 16, 2010, Lucha Libre USA premiered season one of their flagship program Lucha Libre USA: Masked Warriors on MTV2. During season one Lucha Libre USA held TV tapings in multiple venues.

On October 1, 2011, Lucha Libre USA began season 2 of Lucha Libre USA Masked Warriors  airing the first four episodes on MTV2 before bringing the series to Hulu where the remaining episodes were aired.

After the cancellation of the Masked Warriors series the promotion continued to hold live events throughout the West coast until the promotions closure in 2013.

Behind the Mask
Behind the Mask was a documentary feature broadcast on MTV2 and the MTV website. The show follows wrestlers originating from Mexico, the United States and other parts of the world, as they perform physical acts and background stories.  Images of traditional, non-masked American professional wrestlers, like luchador técnico Marco Corleone, are shown entering the lucha libre arenas for staged confrontation.  Commentary in the program stated that rudo luchador R. J. Brewer, in his on-screen persona, wishes to "Americanize" the sport by "cleaning up the Mexican elements" of Lucha Libre USA.

Championships history

LLUSA Heavyweight Championship 

On December 12, 2010, Lizmark Jr. defeated Charly Malice, Marco Corleone and R. J. Brewer in a Lucha Roulette four-way elimination match to become the first-ever Lucha Libre USA Heavyweight Champion.

LLUSA Tag Team Championship 

On January 22, 2011, Rudisimo (El Oriental and Tinieblas Jr.) defeated Puerto Rican Power (P.R. Flyer and San Juan Kid) and Treachery (Rellik and Sydistiko) in a three-way tag match to become the first-ever Lucha Libre USA Tag Team Champions.

Roster

Male wrestlers

Chicas

Alumni

 Cassandro
 Charly Malice
 Chavo Guerrero Jr.
 Chi Chi
 Diamond Face
 Dragoncito
 El Hijo de Anibal
 El Oriental
 Headhunter A
 Headhunter B
 Huracan Ramirez, Jr.
 Isis the Amazon
 Jay Lethal
 Kip Gunn
 LA Park
 Lady Luck
 Latin Lover
 Lujo Esquire
 Marco Corleone
 Magno
 Mascara Púrpura
 Mascarita Dorada
 Medianoche
 Mentallo
 Mini Dragoncito
 Misteriosito
 Neutronic
 Octagoncito
 Petey Williams
 P.R. Flyer
 Reid Flair
 Rellik
 Saber Claw
 San Juan Kid
 Sol I
 Sol II
 Solid
 Stevie Richards

On-air personalities

Hosts

Commentators

Ring announcers

References

External links
  (Archived)
 LuchaProUSA
 Lucha Libre USA at MTV2
 

2010 American television series debuts
American professional wrestling promotions
American professional wrestling television series
Lucha libre
Lucha Libre USA
MTV original programming
2012 American television series endings